D.825 is a north-to-south oriented state road in southern Turkey.

Itinerary
In the table below, the locations on the route are shown:

References

825
Transport in Kayseri Province
Transport in Kahramanmaraş Province
Transport in Gaziantep Province
Transport in Hatay Province